A caporegime or capodecina, usually shortened to capo or informally referred to as "captain" or "skipper", is a position in the Mafia (both the Sicilian Mafia and Italian-American Mafia). A capo is a "made member" of an Italian crime family who heads a regime or "crew" of soldiers and has major status and influence in the organization. Caporegime is an Italian word, used to signify the head of a family in Sicily. In general, the term indicates the head of a branch of an organized crime syndicate who commands a crew of soldiers and reports directly to the don (boss) or an underboss or street boss. The shortened version "capo" has also been used to refer to certain high-ranking members of Latin American drug cartels.

Sources
 Capeci, Jerry. The Complete Idiot's Guide to the Mafia. Indianapolis: Alpha Books, 2002. .
 Pistone, Joseph D. Donnie Brasco: My Undercover Life in the Mafia. Pan Books, 1989. .
 Pileggi, Nicholas. Wiseguy: Life in a Mafia Family. Simon & Schuster, 1985. .

Organized crime members by role
American Mafia
Sicilian Mafia
Italian words and phrases